Allan Eliott-Lockhart (24 January 1803 – 15 March 1878) was a British Conservative politician.

Eliott-Lockhart was elected Conservative MP for Selkirkshire at a by-election in 1846—caused by the resignation of Alexander Pringle who had been appointed Clerk of Sasines—and held the seat until 1861, when he resigned by accepting the office of Steward of the Chiltern Hundreds.

References

External links
 

Conservative Party (UK) MPs for English constituencies
UK MPs 1841–1847
UK MPs 1847–1852
UK MPs 1857–1859
UK MPs 1859–1865
1803 births
1878 deaths